Katikaneni Chakravarthy (born 26 November 1970) is an Indian former cricketer. He played one first-class match for Hyderabad in 1994/95.

See also
 List of Hyderabad cricketers

References

External links
 

1970 births
Living people
Indian cricketers
Hyderabad cricketers
Cricketers from Hyderabad, India